The New Man is a 2007 Swedish-Finnish drama film directed by Klaus Härö.

Plot 
The film portrays Gertrude, a strong and exuberant 17-year-old and her collision with the Swedish welfare state in the early 1950s. It deals with the compulsory sterilisation in Sweden affecting 63,000 people between 1934 and 1976.

Cast
 Julia Högberg - Gertrud
 Maria Lundqvist - Solbritt
 Lo Kauppi - Jenni
 Ellen Mattsson - Astrid
 Ann-Sofie Nurmi - Alba
 Christoffer Svensson - Axel
 Tobias Aspelin - Dr Berg
 Anna Littorin - Lisa

External links 
 

2007 drama films
Swedish drama films
Sterilization in fiction
Eugenics in fiction
Films directed by Klaus Härö
2007 films
2000s Swedish films
2000s Swedish-language films